Susan Kay Nolen-Hoeksema (May 22, 1959 – January 2, 2013) was an American professor of psychology at Yale University. Her research explored how mood regulation strategies could correlate to a person's vulnerability to depression, with special focus on a construct she called rumination as well as gender differences.

Biography

Education and employment
Nolen-Hoeksema was born in Springfield, Illinois. As an undergraduate, Susan Nolen-Hoeksema attended Yale University where she received a Bachelor of Arts with a major in psychology. She graduated in 1982 summa cum laude. She then went on to University of Pennsylvania where she earned a Master of Arts (1984) and Ph.D (1986) in clinical psychology. As a graduate student, Susan's research focused primarily on understanding the predictors of depression among children and adolescents. Nolen-Hoeksema led the Depression and Cognition Program at Yale University. Though traditionally the focus of the lab was on depression, past and current work focused on generalized anxiety disorder, social anxiety disorder and other mood disorders.

From 1986 to 1995, she was a faculty member at Stanford University receiving tenure in 1993. From 1995 to 2004 she was a tenured professor at the University of Michigan in the Personality Area. From 2004 to 2013, Nolen-Hoeksema was a professor and researcher at Yale, as well as the head of the Yale Depression and Cognition Program.

She was the founding editor of the Annual Review of Clinical Psychology from 2005 to 2013.

She died on January 2, 2013, of complications from heart surgery to repair damage caused by a blood infection.

Honors and awards
 James McKeen Cattell Fellow Award, 2013  from the Association for Psychological Science. 
Nolen-Hoeksema's life work and research was honored in February 2014 by a special section in the Journal of Abnormal Psychology, volume 123, issue 1.

Bibliography

Books
Nolen-Hoeksema published a dozen books, including scholarly books, textbooks, and three books for the general public on women's mental health. 
Atkinson and Hilgard's Introduction to Psychology 16th Ed." Engage Learning EMEA, 2014.
The Power of Women: Harness Your Unique Strengths at Home, at Work, and in Your Community, 2010, Times Books 
Atkinson and Hilgard's Introduction to Psychology 15th Ed.. Wadsworth Cengage Learning: EMEA, 2009.
Handbook of depression in adolescents (with Lori Hilt)    2008,  Routledge 
Women Conquering Depression: How to Gain Control of Eating, Drinking, and Overthinking and Embrace a Healthier Life   2006,  Henry Holt 
Women Who Think Too Much: How to Break Free of Overthinking and Reclaim Your Life  2003, Holt 
Atkinson and Hilgard's Introduction to Psychology 14th. Ed.. Wadsworth/Thomson Learning: Belmont, 2003.
Coping With Loss (with Judith Larson )   1999,  Lawrence Erlbaum Associates, Publishers
 Clashing Views on Abnormal Psychology   1998  Dushkin/McGraw-Hill 
Sex Differences in Depression    1990, Stanford University Press
Depression: Treatment and Management (2 Volumes) (with Haraton Davidian and Hamideh Jahangiri ), volume one  volume two 
Psychotherapy of depression in elderly (3 Volumes) (with Hamzeh Ganji and Hamideh Jahangiri ), volume one  volume two  volume three

References

External links
 What Happens When Things Go Wrong: Mental Illness, Part I, Paul Bloom and Susan Nolen-Hoeksema, Academic Earth

1959 births
2013 deaths
Yale University faculty
Yale University alumni
University of Pennsylvania alumni
People from Springfield, Illinois
Stanford University Department of Psychology faculty
University of Michigan faculty
Annual Reviews (publisher) editors
American clinical psychologists